Horace Cameron Wright (c. 1901  1979), known as "Cam", was a Welsh scientist who worked for the Royal Naval Physiological Laboratory at Alverstoke, near Gosport in Hampshire and for the British Ministry of Aircraft Production during World War II.

Early life
Nothing about his parents are known, but he was raised by Welsh mural artist Frank Brangwyn. In his early days he was nicknamed the "Camiknickers".

Works
He conducted experiments on the effects of x rays on the human body, new bombs designed to blow up dams, underwater explosions, and underwater escapes from submerged aircraft and submarines, among other things. Most of the more dangerous experiments he performed on himself. He once spent weeks in hospital after being blown out of the water by a massive self-inflicted explosion, and surfaced from an artificial depth of 90 metres on a single breath of air. All of his research reports remain classified, however.

Status
All25 of his research reports are currently lost.

References
Trevor Norton, Stars beneath the Sea, Carroll & Graf 1999

Welsh physicists
Weapons scientists and engineers
1900s births
1979 deaths